Fairview High School is a public high school in Sherwood, Defiance County, Ohio, United States. It is the only high school in the Central Local School District.

History
In 1958, all high school students in the area that would come to be known as the Central Local School District came to Farmer High School. Since the title of “Farmer” was inaccurate, considering that students from Mark Center, Sherwood, Ney as well as Farmer attended, administrators decided that the school needed a new name. It was then determined that there should be a competition to figure out the new name of the school. The three finalists were the names Fairview, Green Meadows, and William Manahan, which Fairview won. Then another contest was held for the nickname. After several rounds of voting, the students decided on three more finalists: Apaches, Spartans, and Titans. The winning entry (Apaches) was submitted by Ward Fritz, Social Studies teacher and Boys Basketball head coach. 
	
As a result of the new name, the newspaper was called the “War Whoop” and the yearbook, the “Warrior”.
	
Back in 1958, the school offered very different academic courses than it does today. For example, Latin was taught. Varying business classes were taught, such as Shorthand.
	
The athletics were also far different at the inception of the school than they are now. Originally, Fairview's only sports were baseball, which was played in the spring as well as the fall, and basketball. Girls’ sports did not exist. The first athletic event ever held at Fairview (which was then at Farmer) was a baseball game against Stryker, a game which Fairview won. The winning pitcher was Lamar Peters. The first basketball game was against Hilltop. Fairview won that game as well. In the spring of 1961, track became a sport at Fairview. That fall, it added Cross Country as well. For the first four years of Fairview, it was an independent school, unaffiliated with any conference. However, in the fall of 1962, Fairview joined the Green Meadows Conference along with Hicksville, Ayersville, Jewell, and Paulding. In the winter of 1965–66, wrestling began its rich tradition. The school added football in 1967 and it became a varsity sport in 1969. Finally, in the spring of 1975, track was recognized as a girls sport. The following school year, cross country, volleyball, basketball, and softball were added as well.

Activities

Fall
Varsity and Junior Varsity Football
Varsity and Junior Varsity Volleyball (Girls)
Varsity and Junior Varsity Cross Country (Boys and Girls)
Varsity and Junior Varsity Golf (Boys and Girls)
Marching band
Athletic Training
Football Cheerleading

Winter
Varsity, Junior Varsity, and Freshman Basketball (Boys and Girls)
Varsity and Junior Varsity Wrestling
Quiz Bowl
Pep Band
Stage Band
Concert Band
Basketball Cheerleading

Spring
Varsity and Junior Varsity Baseball
Varsity and Junior Varsity Softball
Varsity and Junior Varsity Track and Field (Boys and Girls)

'Academics'

Currently, Central Local Schools is the only Defiance County, Ohio, school to be honored with the coveted "Excellent with Distinction" award given by the Ohio Department of Education.

Ohio High School Athletic Association State Championships

 Girls Basketball – 1989 
 Boys Basketball - 1946* 
 * Title won by Farmer High School prior to consolidation into Fairview.
 Softball - 2021

Notable alumni
 Bruce Berenyi, Major League Baseball player

References

External links
 

High schools in Defiance County, Ohio
Public high schools in Ohio